The Portsmouth Dreadnoughts are an American football team currently based in Portsmouth, England. The club was founded in 2012. The team is named after the famous battleship  that was built in Portsmouth in 1906. The team play in the BAFA National Leagues South West Division.

History

The Portsmouth Dreadnoughts were founded in April 2012 by three players, Pete Southwood, Ben Bell and David Bennett. They had met whilst playing and coaching for the Solent Thrashers, but found that the travel considerations of a long drive to Southampton from Horndean were significant enough to make them look into how to keep playing American Football, but not at such a distance.

The team's first game was played against the Plymouth Extreme.

The Dreadnoughts were admitted to the National league for the start of the 2014 season. They failed to win a game in their first season which was brought to an early end when they were disqualified from the last 4 games of the season for bringing the game into disrepute by allowing unregistered coaches to participate and for permitting someone to participate in club activities whilst banned for safeguarding reasons. The Dreadnoughts returned to the National Leagues for the start of the 2015 season, during which they recorded their first ever league win in a 48 points to 15 victory over the Hastings Conquerors

References

External links
Portsmouth Dreadnoughts Official Web Site
Portsmouth Dreadnoughts on Facebook
Portsmouth Dreadnoughts on Twitter

American football in England
American football teams established in 2012
American football teams in England
Sport in Portsmouth
2012 establishments in England